The sound recording copyright symbol or phonogram symbol, represented by the graphic symbol , is the copyright symbol used to provide notice of copyright in a sound recording (phonogram) embodied in a phonorecord (LPs, audiotapes, cassette tapes, compact discs, etc.). It was first introduced in the Rome Convention for the Protection of Performers, Producers of Phonograms and Broadcasting Organisations. The United States added it to its copyright law as part of its adherence to the Geneva Phonograms Convention in 17 U.S.C. § 402, the codification of the Copyright Act of 1976.

The letter P in  stands for phonogram, the legal term used in most English-speaking countries to refer to works known in U.S. copyright law as "sound recordings".

A sound recording has a separate copyright that is distinct from that of the underlying work (usually a musical work, expressible in musical notation and written lyrics), if any.  The sound recording copyright notice extends to a copyright for just the sound itself and will not apply to any other rendition or version, even if performed by the same artist(s).

International treaties
The symbol first appeared in the Rome Convention for the Protection of Performers, Producers of Phonograms and Broadcasting Organisations, a multilateral treaty relating to copyright, in 1961. Article 11 of the Rome Convention provided:

When the Geneva Phonograms Convention, another multilateral copyright treaty, was signed in 1971, it included a similar provision in its Article 5:

United States law
The symbol was introduced into United States copyright law in 1971, when the US extended limited copyright protection to sound recordings. The United States anticipated signing onto the Geneva Phonograms Convention, which it had helped draft. On October 15, 1971, Congress enacted the Sound Recording Act of 1971, also known as the Sound Recording Amendment of 1971, which amended the 1909 Copyright Act by adding protection for sound recordings and prescribed a copyright notice for sound recordings. The Sound Recording Act added a copyright notice provision specific to sound recordings, which incorporated the symbol prescribed in the Geneva Convention, to the end of section 19 of the 1909 Copyright Act:

The designation of the symbol continues in §  of the current Copyright Act of 1976. That section provides for the a non-mandatory copyright notice on sound recordings:

If a notice appears on the phonorecords, it shall consist of the following three elements:
(1) the symbol ℗ (the letter P in a circle); and
(2) the year of first publication of the sound recording; and
(3) the name of the owner of copyright in the sound recording, or an abbreviation by which the name can be recognized, or a generally known alternative designation of the owner; if the producer of the sound recording is named on the phonorecord labels or containers, and if no other name appears in conjunction with the notice, the producer’s name shall be considered a part of the notice.

Encoding

See also
 Copyright symbol
 Enclosed Alphanumerics

References

Copyright law
Typographical symbols
United States copyright law
Symbols introduced in 1971